Pahang Malay is a Malayic language spoken in the Malaysian state of Pahang. It is regarded as the dominant Malay dialect spoken along the vast riverine systems of Pahang, but co-exists with other Malay dialects traditionally spoken in the state. Along the coastline of Pahang, Terengganu Malay is spoken in a narrow strip of sometimes discontiguous fishing villages and towns. Another dialect spoken in Tioman island is a distinct Malay variant and most closely related to Riau Archipelago Malay subdialect spoken in Natuna and Anambas islands in the South China Sea, together forming a dialect continuum between the Bornean Malay and the Mainland Peninsular/Sumatran Malay.

Nonetheless, the essential unity of Pahang and Terengganu Malay is demonstrated by the number of shared lexical, syntactic, and phonetics innovations. Both varieties, along with Kelantan Malay, have been classified under the subgroup of the East Coast dialect of Malay peninsula, due to their possible common origin.

Pahang Malay is known for its sharp rise and fall of tone and quick flowing accent. It exhibits a number of differences from the Standard Malay, particularly in phonology and vocabulary. Even though it shares many similarities with standard Malay, the dialect in its purest form remains unintelligible to standard Malay speakers. There are a number of sub-dialects of Pahang Malay identified by linguists, but the form spoken in the vicinity of Pahang's royal capital, Pekan, is considered as its 'standard sub-dialect'.

The dialect is traditionally written in Jawi script, but its role as the main writing language has been replaced with Standard Malay written in Rumi. A local radio station, Pahang FM, broadcasts in this dialect.

Name
The term Pahang itself originated from the name of the state which in turn derived from the name of Pahang River, where the early civilisation in the state could have developed from. There have been many theories on the origin of the name Pahang. Local lore states that it is derived from the corruption of the name Mahang tree (Macaranga). On the other hand, William Linehan relates the early foundation of the state to the settlers from the ancient Khmer civilisation, and claims it originates from the word  meaning 'tin', abundantly found in the state. The earliest literary reference to the name 'Pahang' was from the chronicle of the Liu Song dynasty, Book of Song, which records two consecutive envoys received from the kingdom of 'Pohuang' (alternatively Panhuang) between 449 and 457 CE.

Origin
There are at least two theories on the origin of Pahang Malay. Asmah Omar identifies the settlements near the estuary of Pahang River and its adjacent areas, where the early civilisation of Pahang could have begun, as the place of origin of the dialect before it was diffused inland. This area includes Pekan, the historical capital of Pahang, which the subdialect of Pahang Malay spoken in the area is named after. This theory is consistent to the known details of Malay settlement patterns in Southeast Asia. Until the 19th century, the Malay population was riverine and maintaining inter-communal link by river and maritime routes.

Another theory by Tarmizi Harsah, suggests that the dialect originated from Ulu Tembeling, in deep hinterland of Pahang. Although it retains part of the general characteristics of Pahang Malay, the dialect of Ulu Tembeling has the special feature of consonantal diphthongisation at the end of words, which is one of its kind among Malay dialects of the peninsula. Another unique feature of the dialect is that it retains several phonological characteristics of Ancient Malay, for example, the use of vowel *i and *u, and the addition of glottal consonant at the last position in words ending with vowels. However, Tarmizi's theory went against the commonly accepted Malay settlement patterns which began at the river mouth and coastal areas before dispersing inland.

Distribution
Pahang Malay is almost exclusively spoken within the state of Pahang, though there are sizeable migrant communities of its native speakers in urban areas like Klang Valley, and other states of the peninsula. Nevertheless, within the state of Pahang, there are at least two other distinct Malay varieties traditionally spoken. Coastal Terengganu Malay, a relative variant with shared lexical, synctatic, and phonetics innovations, is spoken in narrow strip of sometimes discontiguous fishermen villages and towns along the coastline of Pahang. This complicated spatial layering of different Malay variants, often within a few kilometres' radius between hamlets of Pahang Malay speakers along the riverine systems and the Terengganu-speaking coastal fishermen villages, is influenced by the historical movement of Terengganu Malays to that area. For centuries, the coastal line stretching from Terengganu border to the Endau of Johor, was the heaven for temporary settlements of fishermen from Terengganu and Kelantan who came there during fishing season. Over the time, a well established communities began to develop in areas like Beserah, Kuala Pahang, and Kuala Rompin. Another dialect not related to Pahang Malay, is spoken in Tioman island of Pahang and Aur Islands of Johor, and most closely related only to Sarawak Malay, spoken across the South China Sea in northwest Borneo. Despite the existence these foreign and isolated Malay variants, Pahang Malay remains as the de facto official dialect of the state, predominantly spoken along the lining of its vast riverine systems.

Dialects and sub-dialects
Due to high divergences of the dialects and sub-dialects of Pahang Malay, their classifications remain unclear so far. Among the earliest attempt to classify these dialects and sub-dialects was by Asmah Omar who conducted her study based on the daerah (district). She enlisted eight sub-dialects of Pahang Malay, namely the dialects of Pekan, Benta, Raub, Ulu Tembeling, Rompin, Temerloh, Kuala Lipis and Bentong. She also named the sub-dialect spoken in the vicinity of Pekan, including the state capital, Kuantan, as the 'standard sub-dialect' and the major source for other sub-dialects spoken inland. Her view is based on the prestige of Pekan and Kuantan as the main economic, cultural and administration centres of the state.

Other scholars like Collins and Tarmizi Harsah provided an alternative method in this dialectal study, focusing on the geographic units of river basins and coastal strips, rather than on the existing political boundaries. This is based on the fact that the spread of these sub-dialects is independent of the political divisions of current Malaysian states. On the other hand, both river basins and coastal strips are the features of topography that have greatly shaped the earliest patterns of migration and settlement in the Malay world of Southeast Asia. Based on this, Tarmizi Harsah identified three main variants of Pahang Malay, spoken along the lining of three main rivers of Pahang; Pahang River, Jelai River and Lipis River.

Characteristics

Phonology
In general, like many other dialects of Malay language, the differences between Pahang Malay and the Standard Malay are recognized through changes in phonology at the end of the words. The contrast between coronals and non-coronals is among the first feature recognised by Collins (1983, 1998) and Ajid Che Kob & Mohd Tarmizi (2009). Although this feature is shared among all sub-dialects of Pahang, there are still different vowel realisation patterns found among those variants. These varied patterns are demonstrated in the following tables.

The Standard Malay alveolar trill , at the end of words, is usually omitted in most Malay dialects. But the omitted sound will always be replaced with certain phonetic forms, either through the elongation of consonant or de-articulation of schwa. Both forms exist in Pahang Malay and are described by linguists as 'very obvious'.

This does not means that there are no diphthongs in the dialect at all. This phenomenon is considered common among many Malay dialects.

Vocabulary
The following are some differences in vocabulary between Pahang Malay and Standard Malay.

Sample texts

References

Bibliography
 
 
 
 
 
 
 
 
 

Agglutinative languages
Malay language
Malay dialects
Languages of Malaysia
Malayic languages